Sumito Yamashita (born 1966) is a Japanese playwright and writer.

He was born in Kobe. He was awarded 156th Akutagawa Prize in 2016, for the novel Shinsekai (しんせかい "New World").

References

1966 births
Living people
Japanese dramatists and playwrights
Akutagawa Prize winners
People from Kobe